al-Qarara is a Palestinian town located north of Khan Yunis, in the Khan Yunis Governorate of the southern Gaza Strip. According to the Palestinian Central Bureau of Statistics, al-Qarara had a population of over 16,900 inhabitants in mid-year 2006, mostly adherents of Islam.

References

Towns in the Gaza Strip
Khan Yunis Governorate
Municipalities of the State of Palestine